Elizium is the third studio album by English gothic rock band Fields of the Nephilim. It was released in September 1990 through record label Beggars Banquet.

Background and release
Using sensational spelling, the album was named after Elysium.

The album was produced by Andy Jackson (recording engineer), also known for his work with Pink Floyd. The introduction for the third song of the album, "At the Gates of Silent Memory", features spoken lines by Aleister Crowley. The lines are excerpts from Crowley's poem "At Sea", recorded in 1920.

Upon its release in late September 1990, Elizium peaked at number 22 in the UK albums chart. It was the last album Fields of the Nephilim recorded with what is regarded as their classic lineup of Carl McCoy, Tony Pettitt, Peter Yates, and Paul and Alexander "Nod" Wright.

Critical reception

AllMusic called Elizium "the band's best all-around album" and awarded the album 4-and-a-half stars out of five.

Track listing

Personnel

 Carl McCoy – vocals, production
 Paul Wright – lead guitar, production
 Alexander "Nod" Wright – drums, production
 Tony Pettitt – bass guitar, production
 Peter Yates – rhythm guitar, ebow, production

 Additional personnel

 Jon Carin – additional keyboards

 Technical

 Andy Jackson – production, engineering
 Sheer Faith/ Carl McCoy – sleeve design
 Chris Bigg – sleeve design

References

External links 

 

Fields of the Nephilim albums
1990 albums
Beggars Banquet Records albums